Charlotte Schneidewind-Hartnagel (born 2 September 1953) is a German politician. Born in Göttingen, Lower Saxony, she is a member of the Alliance 90/The Greens. Schneidewind-Hartnagel served as a member of the Bundestag from the state of Baden-Württemberg from 2019 to 2021.

Life 
After graduating from the Old Electoral Grammar School in Bensheim in 1973, Schneidewind-Hartnagel began studying German, English and journalism at the Georg-August University in Göttingen. In 1978 she took up an editorial traineeship at the Berlin publisher Agora-Verlag. Later she worked in Worpswede and Bensheim. From 1986 to 1989 she studied business administration at the University of Applied Sciences Rhineland-Palatinate in Worms (degree: Diplom-Betriebswirtin). Afterwards she worked at the press office of the Federal Association of German Freight Transport in Frankfurt am Main, as press officer of the Women's Representative in Bensheim and as a freelance journalist. She succeeded Kerstin Andreae in the Bundestag on 1 November 2019. She is a member of the Children's Commission and the Committee for Family, Senior Citizens, Women and Youth.

References

External links 

  
 Bundestag biography 

1953 births
Living people
Politicians from Göttingen
Members of the Bundestag for Baden-Württemberg
Female members of the Bundestag
21st-century German women politicians
Members of the Bundestag 2017–2021
Members of the Bundestag for Alliance 90/The Greens